In general relativity, light is assumed to propagate in a vacuum along a null geodesic in a pseudo-Riemannian manifold. Besides the geodesics principle in a classical field theory there exists Fermat's principle for stationary gravity fields.

Fermat's principle 

In case of conformally stationary spacetime  with coordinates  a Fermat metric takes the form

where the conformal factor  depends on time  and space coordinates  and does not affect the lightlike geodesics apart from their parametrization.

Fermat's principle for a pseudo-Riemannian manifold states that the light ray path between points  and  corresponds to stationary action.

Principle of stationary integral of energy 

In principle of stationary integral of energy for a light-like particle's motion, the pseudo-Riemannian metric with coefficients  is defined by a transformation

With time coordinate  and space coordinates with indexes k,q=1,2,3 the line element is written in form

where   is some quantity, which is assumed equal 1. Solving light-like interval equation  for  under condition   gives two solutions

where  are elements of the four-velocity.

With   and  even if for one k the energy takes form

In both cases for the free moving particle the Lagrangian is

Its partial derivatives give the canonical momenta

and the forces

Momenta satisfy energy condition  for closed system

which means that  is the energy of the system that combines the light-like particle and the gravitational field.

Standard variational procedure according to Hamilton's principle is applied to action

which is integral of energy. Stationary action is conditional upon zero variational derivatives  and leads to Euler–Lagrange equations

which is rewritten in form

After substitution of canonical momentum and forces they give  motion equations of lightlike particle in a free space

and

where  are the Christoffel symbols of the first kind and indexes  take values .

Static spacetime 
The curve of motion of lightlike particle in four-dimensional spacetime and value of energy   are invariant under this reparametrization.
For the static spacetime the first equation of motion with appropriate parameter   gives  . Canonical momentum and forces take form

Substitution of them in Euler–Lagrange equations gives

After differentiation on the left side and multiplying by  this expression, after the summation over the repeated index , becomes null geodesic equations

where  are the second kind Christoffel symbols with respect to the metric tensor .

So in case of the static spacetime with  the geodesic principle and the energy variational method as well as Fermat's principle give the same solution for the light propagation.

Generalized Fermat's principle 

In the generalized Fermat’s principle  the time is used as a functional and together as a variable. It is applied Pontryagin’s minimum principle of the optimal control theory and obtained an effective Hamiltonian for the light-like particle motion in a curved spacetime. It is shown that obtained curves are null geodesics.

The stationary energy integral for a light-like particle in gravity field and the generalized Fermat principles give identity velocities. The virtual displacements of coordinates retain path of the light-like particle to be null in the pseudo-Riemann space-time, i.e. not lead to the Lorentz-invariance violation in locality and corresponds to the variational principles of mechanics. The equivalence of the solutions produced by the generalized Fermat principle to the geodesics, means that the using the second also turns out geodesics. The stationary energy integral principle gives a system of equations that has one equation more. It makes possible to uniquely determine  canonical  momenta of the particle and forces acting on it in a given reference frame.

Euler–Lagrange equations in contravariant form 

The equations

can be transformed  into a contravariant  form

where the second term in the left part is the change in the energy and momentum transmitted to the gravitational field

when the particle moves in it. The force vector ifor principle of stationary integral of energy is written in form

In general relativity, the energy and momentum of a particle is ordinarily associated  with a contravariant energy-momentum vector . The quantities do not form a tensor. However, for the photon in  Newtonian limit of  Schwarzschild field described by metric in  isotropic coordinates they correspond  to its passive gravitational mass equal to twice  rest mass of the massive particle of  equivalent energy. This is consistent with Tolman, Ehrenfest and Podolsky result  for the active gravitational mass of the photon in case of interaction between directed flow of radiation and a massive particle that was obtained by solving the  Einstein-Maxwell equations.

See also
Fermat's principle
Variational methods in general relativity

References

Further reading

General relativity
Variational principles